Lieutenant Commander Taylor Humphrey Scott (5 December 1946 – 22 October 1987) was a Fleet Air Arm pilot and a test pilot for British Aerospace

Early life 
Scott was born in Newcastle in 1946. He joined the Royal Navy in 1964 and after training, flew Sea Vixens. This was followed by tour with the US Navy, including  the Top Gun course at the Fighter Weapons School   at NAS Miramar. Consequently he was posted to HMS Ark Royal in 1974 as an Air Weapons Instructor, flying F-4K Phantoms.

Navy test pilot 
During the development of the Sea Harrier, John Farley, (Hawker Siddeley's deputy chief test pilot) asked Fleet Air Arm for "one of your best youngsters off Ark Royal " to be the Project Liaison Officer. As a result, Scott was posted to Dunsfold in 1977. There he quickly impressed John Farley, and was made the leader of the Sea Harrier cockpit development programme. In this programme, the Sea Harrier avionics were flight tested in a modified two seat Hunter.

Civilian test pilot 
In 1979 he left the Royal Navy to join British Aerospace (BAe) as a  Sea  Harrier test pilot. In this role he was responsible for rationalising the Sea Harrier cockpit displays. At the start of the Falklands War Scott  was  instrumental in  clearing  the  AIM-9L Sidewinder for  use from the Sea Harrier.   He also volunteered for active  service, however this was refused. Instead he was placed on temporary recall and tasked with helping to re-form and train 809 NAS. He returned to BAe and in 1983 was appointed Sea Harrier Project Test Pilot. In October 1987 Scott was promoted to Deputy Chief Test Pilot.

On 22 October 1987 Scott was carrying out the final pre-delivery test flight of Harrier GR. 5 ZD325, before handover to the Royal Air Force. A malfunction of the parachute-deployment rocket ejected him from the aircraft at 30,000 ft. His parachute was damaged and he was killed in the fall. The explanation put forward by the inquest was, that when Scott lowered his seat to reduce glare on the instrument panel, the  manual  override (MOR) had been activated by a loose object under the MOR rocket operating rod. In March 1990 a BAe memorandum relating to the cause of this incident was briefly discussed in the House of Commons by Alan Clark.

Personal life 
He married Margaret A. Hayes in 1972  and together they had two children.

Quotations

Notes

References

Fleet Air Arm aviators
British test pilots
Harrier Jump Jet
Royal Navy officers
1946 births
1987 deaths
Aviators killed in aviation accidents or incidents in England